Esther Wong (August 13, 1917 – August 14, 2005) was a Chinese-American music promoter, called the "Godmother of Punk" in Los Angeles, California.

Life 
She was born in Shanghai in 1917. Her father had been an automobile importer, and she had been well-educated and well-traveled before emigrating to the United States in 1949 to escape the Communist takeover of China. She worked as a clerk for a shipping company for 20 years before opening Madame Wong's (黃家園), a Los Angeles Chinatown restaurant with a floorshow—originally at 949 Sun Mun Way, located in the original 1938 Rice Bowl restaurant.

After fierce initial resistance, she became a punk rock and new wave music promoter. Polynesian dance acts weren't attracting customers, yet when Paul Greenstein, a Los Angeles "bum vivant," first approached her husband George about booking bands, she declined. Greenstein's persistence, and the fact that he had already given the nearby "Atomic Cafe" a new lease on life (cross-pollination between owners' children worked the magic), caused her to agree to a trial run in Fall of 1978. The first show included The Alley Cats and The Zeros. Initially, under Greenstein, a showcase for unsigned, unbookable punk-bands, Madame Wong's was one of few places such bands could perform. With the exit of Greenstein, Madame Wong's morphed into a power-pop palace with bookings more influenced by a now-interested Wong. Notable bands that she showcased included Los Lobos, The Knack, The Police, The Motels, The Members, Fishbone, The Go-Go's, X, The Alley Cats, The Bangs, Oingo Boingo, Los Illegals, Candy, Guns N' Roses, Black Flag, Daniel Amos, Fear, Red Hot Chili Peppers, and the Ramones. Eventually, this led to her nickname, the "Godmother of Punk."

She closed the original "Madame Wong's" after a fire in 1985. She opened another venture, "Madame Wong's West" at 2900 Wilshire in Santa Monica, California in 1978 and it had a successful run before it closed in 1991.

The original "Madame Wong's" unofficially reopened for a brief period in 2009/2010, when Ben Kramer, Stuart Friedel, and Rob Cudd, who were living in an apartment that now occupies the premises, hosted concerts in their living room, using the name Madame Wong's in homage to the original venue. Acts that year included Devendra Banhart, Vampire Weekend's secret 2009 Halloween show, The Answering Machine, Wavves, Smith Westerns, Jounce, Pearl Harbor and the Explosions, Backbiter, Salvador Santana, The Growlers, Harlem, and others.

Esther Wong died from emphysema and lung cancer on August 14, 2005, in Los Angeles, only a day after her 88th birthday. She was survived by her second husband, Harry Wong, two children, Frank Wong and Melinda Braun, six grandchildren, and four great-grandchildren.

See also 
Hong Kong Café
Atomic Cafe

References

External links 
Obituary at USA Today
Chinatown Wars – Madame Wong's And Hong Kong Cafe – Restoring Chinatown – KCET
Original Offenders: Esther Wong
The Go-Go's Notebook: Madame Wong's
The Go-Go's Notebook: The Chinatown Punk Wars
1979 When Chinatown Was Punk – pt 1 

1917 births
2005 deaths
Chinese emigrants to the United States
Deaths from emphysema
Deaths from lung cancer in California
People from Los Angeles
Businesspeople from Shanghai
Musicians from Shanghai
Chinese Civil War refugees